The 2020 season was the Houston Texans' 19th season in the National Football League and their seventh and final season under head coach Bill O'Brien. Following their week 10 loss to the Cleveland Browns, they failed to match/improve their 10–6 record from last year and failed to win 10 or more games for the first time since the 2017 season. They were eliminated from playoff contention after a Week 14 loss to the Chicago Bears and suffered their first losing season since 2017. This was also the first season since 2012 that DeAndre Hopkins was not on the roster, as he was traded to the Arizona Cardinals in the offseason. This was the Texans' final season with Deshaun Watson as the starting quarterback, as he would sit out the next season demanding to be traded. Watson's final game as a Texan was on January 2, 2021, a 38-41 loss to the Tennessee Titans, and would be traded to the Cleveland Browns a year later, on March 18, 2022.

Following their first 0–4 start since 2008 and the trade of DeAndre Hopkins to the Arizona Cardinals, the Texans fired O'Brien on October 5, 2020. Romeo Crennel was later named as interim head coach and broke the record for oldest NFL head coach in history at 73 years and 112 days old.  The season was stained with drama primarily consisting of trade rumors about Deshaun Watson and J. J. Watt and locker room issues. This season began a lengthy period of futility for the Texans, as they have failed to win more than a quarter of their games in any of their last three seasons, and have never qualified for the playoffs in that time.

Draft

Draft trades
The Texans traded their 2020 first-round selection, as well as their first-round and second-round selections in the 2021 NFL Draft, offensive tackle Julién Davenport, and cornerback Johnson Bademosi to the Miami Dolphins in exchange for offensive tackle Laremy Tunsil, wide receiver Kenny Stills, a 2020 fourth-round selection, and a 2021 sixth-round selection.
The Texans traded defensive end Jadeveon Clowney to the Seattle Seahawks in exchange for linebacker Jacob Martin, linebacker Barkevious Mingo, and a third-round selection.
The Texans traded the third-round selection gained from Seattle in the Jadeveon Clowney trade to the Las Vegas Raiders (then Oakland Raiders) in exchange for cornerback Gareon Conley.
The Texans traded a conditional fourth-round selection (that became a third round selection after meeting aforementioned condition) to the Cleveland Browns in exchange for running back Duke Johnson.
The Texans traded a sixth-round selection to the New England Patriots in exchange for cornerback Keion Crossen.
The Texans traded wide receiver DeAndre Hopkins as well as a fourth-round selection to the Arizona Cardinals in exchange for a second-round selection, running back David Johnson, and a fourth-round selection in the 2021 NFL Draft.
The Texans traded a second-round selection (No. 57) to the Los Angeles Rams in exchange for wide receiver Brandin Cooks and a 2022 fourth-round selection.
The Texans traded a fourth-round selection (136th) and two seventh-round selections (248th and 250th) to the Los Angeles Rams in exchange for a fourth-round selection (126th).
The Texans traded a seventh-round selection (240th) to the New Orleans Saints in exchange for a 2021 sixth-round selection.

Staff

Final roster

Preseason
The Texans' preseason schedule was announced on May 7, but was later cancelled due to the COVID-19 pandemic.

Regular season

Schedule
The Texans' 2020 schedule was announced on May 7.

Note: Intra-division opponents are in bold text.

Game summaries

Week 1: at Kansas City Chiefs
NFL Kickoff Game

With the loss, the Texans began the season at 0–1 for the fourth consecutive season.

Week 2: vs. Baltimore Ravens

With the loss, the Texans dropped to 0–2 for the first time since the 2018 season.

Week 3: at Pittsburgh Steelers

The Texans held a 21–17 lead at halftime, but were shutout in the second half to lose 21–28. With the loss, Houston fell to 0–3 for the first time since 2018.

Week 4: vs. Minnesota Vikings

With this loss, the Texans dropped to 0–4 for the first time since the 2008 season. The following day, head coach and general manager Bill O'Brien was fired.

Week 5: vs. Jacksonville Jaguars

With the win, the Texans improved to 1–4 and 1–0 under interim head coach Romeo Crennel.

Week 6: at Tennessee Titans

With the loss, the Texans dropped to 1–5 and 1–1 under Crennel.

Week 7: vs. Green Bay Packers

With the loss, the Texans fell to 1–6 and 1–2 under Crennel.

Week 9: at Jacksonville Jaguars

With the close victory, the Texans improved to 2–6 and 2–2 under Crennel. This was also their sixth consecutive win against the Jaguars.

Week 10: at Cleveland Browns

The game was delayed moments before kickoff due to severe weather, with the weather delay lasting for 37 minutes. The heavy rains affected filed conditions while the gusty winds in the area made passing and kicking the ball difficult. Early in the 2nd quarter, facing a 4th and 2 from the Cleveland 2-yard line, Houston went for it, but Deshaun Watson was sacked by Myles Garrett for a 2-yard loss. Later in the quarter, the Browns would also turn the ball over on downs when a Baker Mayfield pass intended for Jarvis Landry fell incomplete in Houston territory. Texans kicker Ka'imi Fairbairn attempted a 46-yard field goal late in the 3rd, but the gusty winds pushed the ball wide left; Cleveland would score the game's first touchdown on the following drive with a 9-yard run from Nick Chubb. The two teams would trade punts on their next respective drives before Houston would score its first points of the game on a 90-yard drive that ended with a 16-yard pass from Watson to tight end Pharaoh Brown with 4:59 left in the game. On the ensuing kickoff, Donovan Peoples-Jones muffed the punt on his own 2-yard line and recovered it for a 1-yard gain before being taken down by Buddy Howell. The Texans had a chance to get the ball back late in the game with the Browns facing a 3rd and 3 at their own 40-yard line with 1:07 left to play, but Chubb broke free for a 59-yard run before intentionally running out of bounds at the Houston 1-yard line. Cleveland would take a knee twice to end the game.

With the close loss, the Texans fell to 2–7 and 2–3 under Crennel.

Week 11: vs. New England Patriots

Days prior to the game, New England head coach Bill Belichick stated that Romeo Crennel is the best coach he ever worked with. The two previously worked together with the New York Giants in the 80s, while Crennel served as Belichick's defensive coordinator on the Patriots from 2001 to 2004. This is the second time Crennel will face off against his former team as a head coach. At the time of kickoff, Belichick and Crennel will set a record for the oldest head coaching matchup in NFL history at 68 and 73 years old, respectively, for a combined age of 141 years.

With the win, the Texans improved to 3–7 and 3–3 under Crennel.

Week 12: at Detroit Lions
Thanksgiving Day games

With the win, the Texans improved to 4–7 and 4–3 under Crennel. The day following the game, it was announced that receiver Kenny Stills would be cut from the team. The move was a mutual decision between Stills and the team.

Week 13: vs. Indianapolis Colts

With the loss, the Texans fell to 4–8 and 4–4 under Crennel.

Week 14: at Chicago Bears

With this loss, the Texans were eliminated from playoff contention for the first time since 2017. The Texans fell to 4–9 and 4–5 under Crennel.

Week 15: at Indianapolis Colts

Week 16: vs. Cincinnati Bengals
 After the loss, J. J. Watt was seen at the postgame poastal during his interview very angry about how the season had gone up to that point. With the loss, the Texans fell to 4–11.

Week 17: vs. Tennessee Titans

With the loss, the Texans finished their season at 4–12 and were swept by the Titans for the first time since 2007. This was also Deshaun Watson’s final game as the Texans starting quarterback, as he sat out the entire 2021 season due to a trade demand and multiple allegations of sexual assault, which then led to him being traded to the Cleveland Browns just before the 2022 season.

Standings

Division

Conference

Statistics

Team

Individual

Source:

Notes

See also
List of NFL teams affected by internal conflict

References

External links
 

Houston
Houston Texans seasons
Houston Texans